is a village located in Kamikawa Subprefecture, Hokkaido, Japan. As of 2022, the village had an estimated population of 667 among 453 households. Otoineppu designates itself as the "smallest village in Hokkaido".

Etymology

In Ainu language, Otoineppu means "muddy river mouth". The name is probably a reference to muddy appearance of the water at the confluence of the Teshio River and one of its many tributaries, the Otoineppu River.

Geography

Otoineppu is a landlocked village at the north of Hokkaido. The village sits at the northern tip of the Nayoro Basin, and is flanked by the Kitami Mountains to the east and the Teshio Mountains to the west.

The Teshio River, the fourth longest river in Japan, flows north through Otoineppu before turning sharply west near the village center. The JR Hokkaido Sōya Main Line and Japan National Route 40 runs along the Teshio River through Otoineppu.

Neighboring municipalities

Otoineppu borders on four towns in Hokkaido:
Bifuka
Nakagawa
Nakatonbetsu
Esashi (Sōya)

Climate

Otoineppu has a humid continental climate (Köppen: Dfb). Otoineppu, which sits only  from both the Sea of Okhotsk and Japan Sea, is located within a maritime climate. The village is ringed in by mountains from all four directions, and sees significant temperature extremes.

In 1998 the village had Hokkaido's second-deepest snowfall on record.

History

Otoineppu was known as  until 1963. The name of the village was changed due to the fact that center of the village is in the Otoineppu district, and Otoineppu Station was widely known as a terminus on the JR Sōya and Tenpoku Lines.

In the 2017 Japanese general election, 55.97% of Otoineppu's proportional ballots were cast for one of the three parties in the pacifist opposition coalition (the Constitutional Democratic Party, the Social Democratic Party, and the Japanese Communist Party), making it the most left-leaning municipality in the country in this election under that definition.

Transportation

Rail

Otoineppu is served by the JR Hokkaido Sōya Main Line. The Sōya is the northernmost train line in Japan, and runs from Asahikawa Station in Asahikawa in north-central Hokkaido to Wakkanai Station in Wakkanai at the very north of the prefecture. Three stations, Teshiogawa-Onsen, Sakkuru, and Osashima are serviced by local trains; the central Otoineppu is served by both limited express and local trains.

The defunct JNR Tenpoku Line once broke off from the Sōya Main Line at Otoineppu Station and ran north to the coast of the Sea of Okhotsk, and again met the Sōya Main Line at Wakkanai Station. The line was discontinued in 1989 and replaced by bus service.

Roads

Japan National Route (JNR) 40 runs along the Teshio River through Otoineppu, and connects Asahikawa in central Hokkaido to Wakkanai at the northern tip of the prefecture. JNR 275 breaks off from JNR 40 at the village center of Otoineppu and extends on to Hamatonbetsu on the coast of the Sea of Okhotsk.

Education
The Village of Otoineppu maintains two schools, Otoineppu Elementary School and Otoineppu Junior High School. The village also maintains a high school, Hokkaido Otoineppu Arts & Craft High School.

Culture

Mascot

He is a Picea glehnii who is a friendly park ranger. He sometimes wears a crown as a park ranger hat. He also attends events especially school ones. He is unveiled on 4 August 2013.

Notable people from Otoineppu
Keishin Yoshida, cross-country skier

References

External links

Official Website 

Villages in Hokkaido